WUCG-LP is a country, Southern gospel, and bluegrass music formatted broadcast radio station licensed to Blairsville, Georgia, serving Blairsville and Union County, Georgia.  WUCG-LP is owned and operated by The Missionary Quartermaster, Inc.

References

External links
 G93 Online
 

2014 establishments in Georgia (U.S. state)
Southern Gospel radio stations in the United States
Radio stations established in 2014
UCG-LP
UCG-LP
Union County, Georgia